Alptekin is a Turkish surname. Notable people with the surname include:

 Erkin Alptekin, Uyghur activist
 Huseyin Bahri Alptekin, Turkish artist
 Isa Alptekin, Uyghur political leader
 Kamil Ekim Alptekin, Turkish businessman

Uyghur-language surnames
Turkish-language surnamesİsim iki parçadan oluşur. Alp ve tekin. Alp ismi, 1. Yiğit, kahraman, cesur, bahadır kimse. 2. Eski Türklerde kullanılan bir unvan.
2. Tekin.Tek, eşsiz.Uyanık, tetikte.Uslu.Şehzade, prens.Uğurlu. Orjinali Tigindir. Tahd hakı olan şehzade anlamına gelir.